"Bad Day" is a song by Canadian singer Justin Bieber, which appears on his second compilation album Journals (2013). It was released on November 4, 2013, The song is the fifth in Bieber's series Music Mondays, the first four being "Heartbreaker" (October 7), "All That Matters" (October 14), "Hold Tight" (October 21), and "Recovery" (October 28). Bieber released a new single every week for 10 weeks from October 7 to December 9, 2013.

The song samples The Isley Brothers' song Footsteps in the Dark, the same song sampled for Ice Cube's breakthrough hit, It Was A Good Day.

Track listing

Charts

References

2013 singles
Justin Bieber songs
2013 songs
Songs written by Marvin Isley
Songs written by O'Kelly Isley Jr.
Songs written by Ronald Isley
Songs written by Rudolph Isley
Songs written by Justin Bieber
Island Records singles
Number-one singles in Denmark
Song recordings produced by the Audibles
Songs written by James Giannos
Songs written by Dominic Jordan
Songs written by Poo Bear
Songs written by Chris Jasper
Songs written by Ernie Isley